The 2015 CopperWynd Pro Women's Challenge was a professional tennis tournament played on outdoor hard courts. It was the first edition of the tournament and part of the 2015 ITF Women's Circuit, offering a total of $50,000 in prize money. It took place in Scottsdale, United States, on 9–15 November 2015.

Singles main draw entrants

Seeds 

 1 Rankings as of 2 November 2015

Other entrants 
The following players received wildcards into the singles main draw:
  Robin Anderson
  Vania King
  Danielle Lao
  Kylie McKenzie

The following players received entry from the qualifying draw:
  Françoise Abanda
  Jacqueline Cako
  Sharon Fichman
  Sabrina Santamaria

The following player received entry by a lucky loser spot:
  Sophie Chang

Champions

Singles

 Samantha Crawford def.  Viktorija Golubic, 6–3, 4–6, 6–2

Doubles

 Julia Glushko /  Rebecca Peterson def.  Viktorija Golubic /  Stephanie Vogt, 4–6, 7–5, [10–6]

External links 
 2015 CopperWynd Pro Women's Challenge at ITFtennis.com
 

2015 ITF Women's Circuit
2015
Copperwynd
Tennis tournaments in Arizona
2015 in sports in Arizona